The South Australian Railways Z class was a class of 4-4-0 steam locomotives operated by the South Australian Railways.

History
In 1895 James Martin & Co delivered eight 4-4-0 locomotives to the South Australian Railways. In 1911 another two were built by the Islington Railway Workshops.

Class list

Replica
A replica locomotive is being built. It will be numbered Z199.

References

External links

Railway locomotives introduced in 1894
Z
3 ft 6 in gauge locomotives of Australia
4-4-0 locomotives
Scrapped locomotives